Asiosphegina is a subgenus of hoverflies characterized by sternite I being narrow and lanceolate, several times longer than wide or membranous, and non-pilose, as well as the postmetacoxal bridge being broad, it's posterior margin almost straight, at most with small triangular medial incision.

Species

Sphegina achaeta Hippa, Steenis & Mutin, 2015
Sphegina adusta Hippa, Steenis & Mutin, 2015
Sphegina albolobata Steenis, Hippa & Mutin, 2018
Sphegina amamiensis Shiraki, 1968
Sphegina amplistylus Steenis, Hippa & Mutin, 2018
Sphegina apicalis Shiraki, 1930
Sphegina asciiformis Brunetti, 1915
Sphegina atricolor Hippa, Steenis & Mutin, 2015
Sphegina atrimanus Steenis, Hippa & Mutin, 2018
Sphegina bidens Hippa, Steenis & Mutin, 2015
Sphegina bifida Steenis, Hippa & Mutin, 2018
Sphegina bilobata Hippa, Steenis & Mutin, 2015
Sphegina bispinosa Steenis, Hippa & Mutin, 2018
Sphegina bracon Steenis, Hippa & Mutin, 2018
Sphegina brevipilus Steenis, Hippa & Mutin, 2018
Sphegina carinata Hippa, Steenis & Mutin, 2015
Sphegina cerina Hippa, Steenis & Mutin, 2015
Sphegina clavigera Steenis, Hippa & Mutin, 2018
Sphegina collicola Steenis, Hippa & Mutin, 2018
Sphegina crassispina Hippa, Steenis & Mutin, 2015
Sphegina crinita Steenis, Hippa & Mutin, 2018
Sphegina crucivena Hippa, Steenis & Mutin, 2015
Sphegina culex Hippa, Steenis & Mutin, 2015
Sphegina cultrigera Hippa, Steenis & Mutin, 2015
Sphegina dentata Steenis, Hippa & Mutin, 2018
Sphegina distincta Steenis, Hippa & Mutin, 2018
Sphegina ensifera Hippa, Steenis & Mutin, 2015
Sphegina exilipes Steenis, Hippa & Mutin, 2018
Sphegina falcata Hippa, Steenis & Mutin, 2015
Sphegina farinosa Steenis, Hippa & Mutin, 2018
Sphegina fimbriata Steenis, Hippa & Mutin, 2018
Sphegina forceps Hippa, Steenis & Mutin, 2015
Sphegina forficata Hippa, Steenis & Mutin, 2015
Sphegina freyana Stackelberg, 1956
Sphegina furcillata Steenis, Hippa & Mutin, 2018
Sphegina furva Hippa, Steenis & Mutin, 2015
Sphegina ghatsi Steenis, Hippa & Mutin, 2018
Sphegina gigantea Steenis, Hippa & Mutin, 2018
Sphegina gigas Hippa, Steenis & Mutin, 2015
Sphegina granditarsis Steenis, Hippa & Mutin, 2018
Sphegina hamulata Steenis, Hippa & Mutin, 2018
Sphegina hauseri Steenis, Hippa & Mutin, 2018
Sphegina incretonigra Steenis, Hippa & Mutin, 2018
Sphegina index Hippa, Steenis & Mutin, 2015
Sphegina inflata Steenis, Hippa & Mutin, 2018
Sphegina inventum Steenis, Hippa & Mutin, 2018
Sphegina karnataka Steenis, Hippa & Mutin, 2018
Sphegina licina Steenis, Hippa & Mutin, 2018
Sphegina lobulata Steenis, Hippa & Mutin, 2018
Sphegina lucida Steenis, Hippa & Mutin, 2018
Sphegina malaisei Hippa, Steenis & Mutin, 2015
Sphegina minuta Hippa, Steenis & Mutin, 2015
Sphegina mirifica Hippa, Steenis & Mutin, 2015
Sphegina nasuta Hippa, Steenis & Mutin, 2015
Sphegina nigrotarsata Steenis, Hippa & Mutin, 2018
Sphegina nitidifrons Stackelberg, 1956
Sphegina nubicola Steenis, Hippa & Mutin, 2018
Sphegina orientalis Kertész, 1914
Sphegina ornata Steenis, Hippa & Mutin, 2018
Sphegina parvula Hippa, Steenis & Mutin, 2015
Sphegina perlobata Steenis, Hippa & Mutin, 2018
Sphegina philippina Thompson, 1999
Sphegina plautus Steenis, Hippa & Mutin, 2018
Sphegina pollex Hippa, Steenis & Mutin, 2015
Sphegina pollinosa Hippa, Steenis & Mutin, 2015
Sphegina prolixa Steenis, Hippa & Mutin, 2018
Sphegina pusilla Hippa, Steenis & Mutin, 2015
Sphegina radula Hippa, Steenis & Mutin, 2015
Sphegina raduloides Hippa, Steenis & Mutin, 2015
Sphegina setosa Steenis, Hippa & Mutin, 2018
Sphegina sibirica Stackelberg, 1953
Sphegina siculifera Hippa, Steenis & Mutin, 2015
Sphegina simplex Hippa, Steenis & Mutin, 2015
Sphegina sinesmila Hippa, Steenis & Mutin, 2015
Sphegina spathigera Steenis, Hippa & Mutin, 2018
Sphegina spenceri Steenis, Hippa & Mutin, 2018
Sphegina strigillata Steenis, Hippa & Mutin, 2018
Sphegina subradula Hippa, Steenis & Mutin, 2015
Sphegina taiwanensis Steenis, Hippa & Mutin, 2018
Sphegina trichaeta Hippa, Steenis & Mutin, 2015
Sphegina trispina Hippa, Steenis & Mutin, 2015
Sphegina umbrosa Steenis, Hippa & Mutin, 2018
Sphegina uncinata Hippa, Steenis & Mutin, 2015
Sphegina verrucosa Steenis, Hippa & Mutin, 2018
Sphegina vietnamensis Steenis, Hippa & Mutin, 2018

References

Hoverflies
Insect subgenera
Diptera of Europe
Diptera of Asia
Taxa named by Aleksandr Stackelberg